Stadium station is a light rail station serving the Rice–Eccles Stadium on the campus of the University of Utah in Salt Lake City, Utah, United States, served by the Red Line of the Utah Transit Authority's (UTA) TRAX light rail system. The Red Line provides a service from the University of Utah Medical Center to the Daybreak community of South Jordan.

Description 
The address listed by UTA for the station is 1349 East 500 South (East University Boulevard/SR-186). However, the station's two side platforms are actually located immediately east of a one-way (southbound only) section of University Street (SR-282). The station is accessible from both 400 South and 500 South, but not University Street (except at the two previously indicated streets). Situated on the western edge of the University of Utah Campus, the station is just west of the University's Rice–Eccles Stadium with the stadium's parking lot in between. (Rice–Eccles Stadium was the site of the Opening and Closing Ceremonies of the 2002 Winter Olympics, as well as home of the Real Salt Lake major league soccer team [2005-2008].) The area west of the station is older residential housing; southeast of the station is the Mount Olivet Cemetery. As part of the UTA's Art in Transit program, the station features a woven bronze sculpture created by Michael Stutz entitled Flame Figure. Installed in December 2001, the sculpture was commissioned by the Salt Lake City Arts Council to commemorate the 2002 Winter Olympics. Unlike most TRAX stations, Stadium does not have a Park and Ride lot. The station is part of a railway right of way that was created specifically for the former University Line. The station was opened on December 15, 2001 as part of the former University Line and is operated by the Utah Transit Authority.

History 
Following the approval of federal funding in February 2000, construction of the [former] University Line commenced on August 7, 2000. The naming of the station Stadium (due to its proximity to Rice–Eccles Stadium) was made official by the UTA Board on April 25, 2001. The station opened as one of the four new TRAX stations included as part of the University Line.

Stadium Station served as the eastern terminus of the University Line from its completion through the opening of a three-station expansion further east on September 29, 2003; the University Medical Center presently serves as the eastern terminus.

References 

TRAX (light rail) stations
Railway stations in the United States opened in 2001
Railway stations in Salt Lake City
2001 establishments in Utah